"Everything Hits at Once" is a song by American indie rock band Spoon, the first track on their fourth studio album, Girls Can Tell (2001). It was released as the second single from the album on September 10, 2001. The song was intended to be stylistically distinct from the band's past material, incorporating influences from Fleetwood Mac and Elvis Costello and including a mellotron solo. "Everything Hits at Once" has since seen critical acclaim for its arrangement and composition. It was later included on Spoon's greatest hits album Everything Hits at Once (2019), which is named after the song.

Background
Like many of the other songs on Girls Can Tell, "Everything Hits at Once" was intended as a departure from the punkish style the band had previously employed. Spoon frontman Britt Daniel commented on this, "[The song] was a turning point of a song for us. I don't think there's a song that we could have come up with that would have been as far away from [1998 LP] A Series of Sneaks as that one. I was proud of that, and that's why we jammed it on the front of that album. It was a sort of announcement -- we're able and we're excited to go different places."

Stylistically, the song takes influence from classic rock and new wave influences that the band had previously eschewed. Eleanor Friedberger, former Fiery Furnaces singer and Daniel's girlfriend, recalled listening to the song for the first time: "It's so radically different than anything he'd done before. Like he'd totally embraced Fleetwood Mac. I remember Britt listening to Tusk over and over again, and when I heard that, it was like, 'OK, it has sunk in completely—it's working. The song has also been compared to Elvis Costello's work.

The song also features a mellotron solo section, performed by Daniel's friend Conrad Keely of ...And You Will Know Us by the Trail of Dead. Daniel explained the band's thought process:

Release
"Everything Hits at Once" was a late addition to Girls Can Tell, having been added in the second working version of the album produced with Mike McCarthy. "Everything Hits at Once" was released as the second single from Girls Can Tell on September 10, 2001, featuring the band's previous single "The Agony of Laffitte" and alternate versions of "Everything Hits at Once" and "Lines in the Suit" as B-sides. The single did not chart.

"Everything Hits at Once" also appeared as the title track on the band's 2019 compilation album, Everything Hits at Once: The Best of Spoon. Of the song's inclusion, Daniel elaborated, "It felt like something from Girls Can Tell needed to be on the hits record because it was such an important turning point for us in a lot of ways and this is maybe the most sort of single-like one."

Reception
Billboard named the song number 95 on their top 100 singles of 2001; for the song's entry, Andrew Unterberger commented, "One of the 20th century's most consistent bands at writing punchy, smart pop-rock blasts, nothing from Spoon's last two decades have been quite as much of a fist to the gut as Girls Can Tell lead single 'Everything Hits at Once. Heather Phares of AllMusic said of the song, "Britt Daniel's increasingly eclectic and expansive songwriting comes to the forefront on 'Everything Hits at Once,' a taut, brooding pop song driven by vibes, keyboards, yearning, and pride."

Track listing

Personnel
Personnel adapted from Girls Can Tell liner notes.

Spoon
Britt Daniel – vocals, electric guitar
Jim Eno – drums
Josh Zarbo – bass guitar

Additional musicians
Conrad Keely – Mellotron
Laura Phelan – vibraphone

Technical personnel
Britt Daniel – producer
Jim Eno – producer, engineer
John Golden – mastering engineer
Mike McCarthy – producer, engineer

References

External links

Spoon (band) songs
2001 singles
2001 songs
Merge Records singles